Yudelka Bonilla (born September 19, 1976 in Mao) is a female volleyball and beach volleyball player from Dominican Republic, who won the bronze medal in the women's beach team competition at the 2002 Central American and Caribbean Games in San Salvador, El Salvador, partnering Iris Santos. She previously competed in the 1998 version playing with Evelia Cadet, finishing in the 5th place.

College
She played for California Baptist University as an outside hitter from 2004 to 2007, there she set record in kills. She became Association champion in 2004 and 2005 and runner-up in 2007. She also were Conference runner-up in 2005 with her team. She studied a major in kinesiology.

Awards

Individuals

College
 2007 NAIA Women's Volleyball "All-American" (3rd. Team)
 2007 "All GSAC Conference Team"
 2007 GSAC and NAIARegion II Women's "Volleyball Player" of the Week (September 17, 2007)'''
 2005 NAIA Women's Volleyball "All-American" (3rd. Team) 2005 NAIA Tournament "Most Valuable Player" 2005 "All GSAC Conference Team" 2004 NAIA Women's Volleyball "All-American" (1st. Team) 2004 "All GSAC Conference Team" 2004 NAIA Women's Volleyball "All-Tournament Team"''

National team

Beach Volleyball
 2002 Central American and Caribbean Games -  Bronze Medal

References

External links
 GSAC

1976 births
Living people
People from Santa Cruz de Mao
Dominican Republic women's volleyball players
Dominican Republic beach volleyball players
Women's beach volleyball players

Central American and Caribbean Games bronze medalists for the Dominican Republic
Competitors at the 2002 Central American and Caribbean Games
Central American and Caribbean Games medalists in beach volleyball